The Nowhere Man is a 1972 English-language novel by Kamala Markandaya. It was Markandaya's seventh novel, and her own favourite.  The novel is a tragedy of alienation, centred on the racism experienced by an elderly Brahmin, Srinivas, who has lived in London for decades.

Plot
Unlike her other novels, which were set mainly in India, The Nowhere Man is set in England, where Markandaya herself had been living since 1948. The novel's main protagonist, Srinivas, is an elderly spice importer who has lived in South London for almost fifty years, surviving his wife and one of his two sons. In the Britain of 1968, he now faces intensifying racism, reminding him of the slights he had once experienced as a university student in colonial India. As Srinivas slides into depression, the novel captures the cultural separation between first and second-generation immigrant generations: Srinivas's remaining son, Laxman, is impatient with and embarrassed by his father. For a while, Srinivas's self-belief is restored by a romantic relationship with Mrs Pickering, a down-at-heel divorcée, who moves into his house. However, their peace together is threatened by the racist hatred of their neighbours, to which they each find themselves reacting differently.

Reception
The Nowhere Man received relatively little attention at the time it was published. However, it was included in the Penguin India reprints of Markandaya's work, and in 2019 a new edition was published by Hope Road to launch their new imprint, Small Axes.

In 2022, the book was included on the "Big Jubilee Read" list of 70 books by Commonwealth authors, selected to celebrate the Platinum Jubilee of Elizabeth II.

References

Further reading
 Rebecca Angom, Kamala Markandaya’s The Nowhere Man as a Diasporic Novel, Gnosis: An International Journal of English Language and Literature, Vol. 1, No. 3 (2015), pp.129-138. ISSN 2394-0131; pp. 129-138
 Katrina Bennett, Review: The Nowhere Man by Kamala Markanday, The London Magazine, 10 September 2019
 Emma Garman, Feminize Your Canon: Kamala Markandaya, The Paris Review, 6 November 2018
 Sunita Rani, Probing Identities Amid Racial and Cultural Conflicts: Kamala Markandaya's The Nowhere Man and Some Inner Fury, Literature & Aesthetics, Vol. 20, No. 1 (2010)

Indian English-language novels
20th-century Indian novels
1972 Indian novels